Sankey Bridges is part of the Parish of Holy Trinity in Warrington, a unitary authority in the north-west of England. Located on the turnpike road between Warrington, Prescot and Liverpool over the Sankey Brook, which was the boundary of Great Sankey and The County Borough of Warrington, it became home to many industries after the opening of the Sankey Canal, the first wholly artificial canal built in England during the Industrial Revolution.

When opened, the canal entered the River Mersey through a set of locks situated here, although the canal was subsequently extended to locks further downstream, at Fiddlers Ferry and Runcorn Gap.

Geography of Warrington
Bridges across the River Mersey